Tomás Moylan (born 1969) is an Irish former hurler who played as a left corner-forward for the Offaly senior team.

Moylan joined the team during the 1993–94 National League and was a member of the team for just one seasons. An All-Ireland winning captain in the minor grade, he failed to win any honours at senior level.    

At club level, Moylan is a Leinster medalist with St Rynagh's. In addition to this, he has also won four county club championship medals.

References

1969 births
Living people
St Rynagh's hurlers
Offaly inter-county hurlers